The  Méridienne verte (Green Meridian) is a project devised by the architect Paul Chemetov for the 2000 celebration in France. It involved marking on the ground the Paris Meridian crossing France from North to South (from Dunkerque in Nord-Pas-de-Calais to Prats-de-Mollo-la-Preste in Pyrénées-Orientales) by planting trees along the whole line.

On 14 July (Bastille Day) 2000, a picnic was organised along the length of the Méridienne verte. For the occasion, the imaginary line was marked in the sky above Paris by two lasers, located on the Observatory, whose centre defines the longitude of the meridian, and the nearby Senate, also on the line. With a diameter of 4 m and a reach of 1.3 km, their coloured beams lit up the 6th and 14th arrondissements of Paris for three consecutive nights, from 13 to 15 July.

At the intersection of the Meridian and the 45th parallel, in the commune of Ayrens (Cantal), trees have been planted in two perpendicular lines to mark the crossing.

Communes crossed 
From North to South, the  Méridienne verte crosses 8 régions, 20 départements and 337 communes.

 In the Nord-Pas-de-Calais région :
 In the Nord département : Dunkerque, Saint-Pol-sur-Mer, Armbouts-Cappel, Spycker, Pitgam, Drincham, Eringhem, Bollezeele, Rubrouck, Broxeele, Buysscheure, Noordpeene
 In the Pas-de-Calais département : Clairmarais, Arques, Campagne-lès-Wardrecques, Wardrecques, Racquinghem, Quiestède, Roquetoire, Mametz, Aire-sur-la-Lys, Witternesse, Blessy, Liettres, Estrée-Blanche, Ligny-lès-Aire, Westrehem, Fontaine-lès-Hermans, Nédonchel, Fiefs, Sains-lès-Pernes, Hestrus, Conteville-en-Ternois, Hernicourt, Troisvaux, Saint-Pol-sur-Ternoise, Saint-Michel-sur-Ternoise, Herlin-le-Sec, Hautecloque, Buneville, Sibiville, Bouret-sur-Canche, Rebreuve-sur-Canche
In the Picardie région :
 In the Somme département : Bouquemaison, Doullens, Beauval, Beauquesne, La Vicogne, Talmas, Villers-Bocage, Coisy, Cardonnette, Allonville, Rivery, Amiens, Camon, Cagny, Saint-Fuscien, Boves, Sains-en-Amiénois, Cottenchy, Estrées-sur-Noye, Jumel, Ailly-sur-Noye, Chaussoy-Epagny, La Faloise, Folleville
In the Oise département : Paillart, Le Plessier-sur-Bulles, Rouvroy-les-Merles, Breteuil, Beauvoir, Bonvillers, Saint-André-Farivillers, Campremy, Wavignies, Thieux, Bucamps, Le Quesnel-Aubry, Nourard-le-Franc, Le Mesnil-sur-Bulles, Bulles, Litz, La Neuville-en-Hez, Thury-sous-Clermont, Angy, Bury, Balagny-sur-Thérain, Cires-lès-Mello, Blaincourt-lès-Précy, Crouy-en-Thelle, Précy-sur-Oise, Boran-sur-Oise

 In the Île-de-France région :
 In the Val-d'Oise département :  Asnières-sur-Oise, Noisy-sur-Oise, Saint-Martin-du-Tertre, Maffliers, Attainville, Moisselles, Domont, Piscop, Saint-Brice-sous-Forêt, Montmorency, Groslay, Montmagny, Deuil-la-Barre
 In the Seine-Saint-Denis département :  Villetaneuse, Épinay-sur-Seine, L'Île-Saint-Denis, Saint-Denis, Saint-Ouen
 Paris
 In the Hauts-de-Seine département : Villeneuve-la-Garenne
 In the Val-de-Marne département :  Gentilly, Arcueil, Cachan, L'Haÿ-les-Roses, Chevilly-Larue, Fresnes, Rungis
 In the Essonne département :  Wissous, Morangis, Savigny-sur-Orge, Épinay-sur-Orge, Villemoisson-sur-Orge, Sainte-Geneviève-des-Bois, Le Plessis-Pâté, Vert-le-Grand, Leudeville, Saint-Vrain, Itteville, Cerny, D'Huison-Longueville, Vayres-sur-Essonne, Courdimanche-sur-Essonne, Maisse, Gironville-sur-Essonne, Prunay-sur-Essonne, Champmotteux, Boigneville
 In the Centre-Val de Loire région :
 In the Loiret département :  Nangeville, Orveau-Bellesauve, Coudray, Manchecourt, Ramoulu, Aulnay-la-Rivière, Estouy, Yèvre-la-Ville, Boynes, Courcelles, Nancray-sur-Rimarde, Boiscommun, Nibelle, Nesploy, Sury-aux-Bois, Saint-Martin-d'Abbat, Bouzy-la-Forêt, Saint-Aignan-des-Gués, Bray-en-Val, Saint-Benoît-sur-Loire, Sully-sur-Loire, Viglain, Villemurlin, Cerdon
 In the Cher département :  Clémont, Sainte-Montaine, Ménétréol-sur-Sauldre, Presly, Méry-ès-Bois, Allogny, Saint-Éloy-de-Gy, Saint-Doulchard, Marmagne, La Chapelle-Saint-Ursin, Bourges, Le Subdray, Trouy, Arçay, Sainte-Lunaise, Corquoy, Châteauneuf-sur-Cher, Venesmes, Crézançay-sur-Cher, Saint-Symphorien, Chambon, Morlac, Marçais, Ardenais, Le Châtelet, Reigny, Culan, Sidiailles
 In the Auvergne région :
 In the Allier département :  Saint-Éloy-d'Allier, Viplaix, Saint-Palais, Mesples, Saint-Sauvier, Treignat
 In the Limousin région :
 In the Creuse département :  Soumans, Leyrat, Verneiges, Auge, Lussat, Tardes, Le Chauchet, Saint-Priest, La Serre-Bussière-Vieille, Mainsat, Champagnat, Lupersat, Saint-Silvain-Bellegarde, La Villetelle, Saint-Pardoux-d'Arnet, Saint-Maurice-près-Crocq, Saint-Agnant-près-Crocq, Flayat, Malleret, Saint-Oradoux-de-Chirouze, Saint-Martial-le-Vieux
 In the Corrèze département :  Couffy-sur-Sarsonne, Courteix, Saint-Pardoux-le-Neuf, Ussel, Saint-Exupéry-les-Roches, Mestes, Chirac-Bellevue, Saint-Étienne-la-Geneste, Sainte-Marie-Lapanouze, Liginiac, Sérandon
 Once more in the Auvergne région :
 In the Cantal département :  Arches, Pleaux, Sourniac, Le Vigean, Mauriac, Ally, Escorailles, Saint-Martin-Cantalès, Saint-Cirgues-de-Malbert, Saint-Illide, Ayrens, Teissières-de-Cornet, Crandelles, Saint-Paul-des-Landes, Ytrac, Sansac-de-Marmiesse, Saint-Mamet-la-Salvetat, Vitrac, Marcolès, Saint-Antoine, Calvinet, Mourjou, Cassaniouze
 In the Midi-Pyrénées région :
 In the Aveyron département :  Grand-Vabre, Almont-les-Junies, Noailhac, Firmi, Auzits, Escandolières, Goutrens, Rignac, Belcastel, Colombiès, Castanet, Gramond, Sauveterre-de-Rouergue, Quins, Naucelle, Tauriac-de-Naucelle, Saint-Just-sur-Viaur
 In the Tarn département :  Tanus, Tréban, Montauriol, Lacapelle-Pinet, Crespin, Padiès, Andouque, Saint-Julien-Gaulène, Saint-Cirgue, Sérénac, Ambialet, Villefranche-d'Albigeois, Teillet, Le Travet, Arifat, Montredon-Labessonnié, Lacrouzette, Burlats, Saint-Salvy-de-la-Balme, Noailhac, Caucalières, Payrin-Augmontel, Aussillon, Aiguefonde, Mazamet
 In the Languedoc-Roussillon région :
 In the Aude département :  Les Martys, Conques-sur-Orbiel, Miraval-Cabardès, La Tourette-Cabardès, Villanière, Villardonnel, Salsigne, Aragon, Villegailhenc, Pennautier, Carcassonne, Cavanac, Couffoulens, Leuc, Verzeille, Ladern-sur-Lauquet, Saint-Hilaire, Villebazy, Saint-Polycarpe, Belcastel-et-Buc, Terroles, Peyrolles, Serres, Rennes-les-Bains, Sougraigne, Bugarach, Saint-Louis-et-Parahou, Lapradelle-Puilaurens, Gincla, Montfort-sur-Boulzane
 In the Pyrénées-Orientales département : Caudiès-de-Fenouillèdes, Fuilla, Mosset, Conat, Rabouillet, Villefranche-de-Conflent, Serdinya, Escaro, Sahorre, Py, Prats-de-Mollo-la-Preste

See also 
 Paris Meridian

References

External links 
 List of communes traversed by la Méridienne verte, on the website of the French Senate 

Meridians (geography)
2000 establishments in France